Croitana croites, the croites skipper or yellow sand skipper, is a butterfly of the family Hesperiidae. It is endemic to the western plateau and the north-west and south-west coast of the state of Western Australia.

The wingspan is about 25 mm.

The larvae feed on Austrostipa elegantissima, Austrostipa platychaeta and Austrostipa flavescens. They construct a shelter made from rolled leaves of its host plant where it rests during the day. Pupation takes place in this shelter.

External links
Australian Insects
Australian Faunal Directory

Trapezitinae
Butterflies described in 1874
Butterflies of Australia
Taxa named by William Chapman Hewitson